The Juno Awards of 1980, representing Canadian music industry achievements of the previous year, were awarded on 2 April 1980 in Toronto at a ceremony hosted by Burton Cummings at the Harbour Castle Hilton.

CBC Television broadcast the ceremonies throughout Canada from 9pm Eastern Time, and the show was seen by an estimated 1,500,000 viewers .

The show included a number of lip synced performances from Rough Trade with their controversial (at the time) song "High School Confidential", France Joli singing her Disco hit "Come to Me", Burton Cummings singing his hit "Fine State of Affairs", Max Webster with their "Paradise Skies" and pianist Frank Mills playing "Peter Piper". The only live performance of the night was two songs in a row from Gordon Lightfoot, "On the High Seas" and "If You Need Me" (both from his recent Dream Street Rose album), which were quickly added to fill up air time when Paul Anka was unexpectedly absent to receive his "Canadian Music Hall of Fame" award.

The biggest winner of the night was Anne Murray with four awards including the Album and Single of the Year awards.  Murray was once again absent from the award show, this time due to the recent death of her father.

The band Trooper received an unusual nomination for two of their songs in the same category for "Composer of the Year", although technically the songs were from two different albums both charting at the time.

The last award of the show was "Male Vocalist of the Year" presented by ambassador Ken Taylor to the winner Burton Cummings.

Nominees and winners

Female Vocalist of the Year
Winner: Anne Murray

Other nominees:
Carroll Baker
Claudja Barry
Lisa Dal Bello
Joni Mitchell

Male Vocalist of the Year
Winner: Burton Cummings

Other nominees:
Bruce Cockburn
Murray McLauchlan
Gino Vannelli
Neil Young

Most Promising Female Vocalist of the Year
Winner: France Joli

Other nominees:
Alma Faye Brooks
Nana McLean
Karen Silver
Laura Vinson

Most Promising Male Vocalist of the Year
Winner: Walter Rossi

Other nominees:
Bryan Adams
Gary Fjellgaard
Freddie James
Richard Stepp

Group of the Year
Winner: Trooper

Other nominees:
April Wine
Max Webster
Prism
Rush

Most Promising Group of the Year
Winner: Streetheart

Other nominees:
FM
The Minglewood Band
The Raes
Teaze

Composer of the Year
Winner: Frank Mills, "Peter Piper" by Frank Mills

Other nominees:
Tony Green, "Everybody Get Up and Boogie" by Freddie James
Brian Smith, Ra McGuire, "The Boys in the Bright White Sportscar" by Trooper
Brian Smith, Ra McGuire, "3 Dressed Up as a 9" by Trooper
Gino Soccio, "Dancer" by Gino Soccio

Country Female Vocalist of the Year
Winner: Anne Murray

Other nominees:
Carroll Baker
Marie Bottrell
Glory-Anne Carriere
Iris Larratt

Country Male Vocalist of the Year
Winner: Murray McLauchlan

Other nominees:
Wilf Carter
Eddie Eastman
Ray Griff
Ronnie Prophet

Country Group or Duo of the Year
Winner: The Good Brothers

Other nominees:
Carlton Showband
The Emeralds
Family Brown
The Mercey Brothers

Folk Artist of the Year
Winner: Bruce Cockburn

Other nominees:
Murray McLauchlan
Gordon Lightfoot
Joni Mitchell
Valdy

Instrumental Artist of the Year
Winner: Frank Mills

Other nominees:
Liona Boyd
André Gagnon
Hagood Hardy
Gino Soccio

Producer of the Year
Winner: Bruce Fairbairn, Armageddon by Prism

Other nominees:
Bob Gallo, Night Music by Hellfield
Paul Gross, Images at Twilight by Saga
Andre Perry, I Want You by Wilson Pickett
Domenic Troiano, Fret Fever by Domenic Troiano

Recording Engineer of the Year
Winner: David Greene, Concerto for Contemporary Violin by Paul Hoffert

Other nominees:
Nick Blagona, "Say Hello" by April Wine, "Under My Thumb", Streetheart
Andrew Hermant, "The Birdwalk" by Hagood Hardy, Riel Soundtrack by Bill McCauley
Paul Page, "Hold on I'm Comin'" by Karen Silver
Mark Wright, "Let Go the Line" and "Paradise Skies" by Max Webster

Canadian Music Hall of Fame
Winner: Paul Anka

Nominated and winning albums

Album of the Year
Winner: Anne Murray, New Kind of Feeling

Other nominees:
Armageddon, Prism
Flying Colors, Trooper
Hemispheres, Rush
Hot Shots, Trooper

Best Album Graphics
Winner: Rodney Bowes, Cigarettes by The Wives

Other nominees:
Rodney Bowes, Good-Bye LA by Bob Segarini
Heather Cooper, Hoffert: Concerto for Contemporary Violin/Stravinsky by Paul Hoffert
Dave Elliot, Private Eye (self-titled)
Paul Hodgson, Rendezvous by CANO

Best Children's Album
Winner: Sharon, Lois & Bram, Smorgasbord

Other nominees:
Chickery Chick, Sandra Beech
Going Bananas, All the Performers of the Mariposa in the Schools Program
I Lost My Pet Lizard, Brenda and Paul Hoffert
Mr. Dressup, For a Song, Ernie Coombs

Best Classical Album of the Year
Winner: The Crown of Ariadne, Judy Loman, R. Murray Schafer (composer)

Other nominees:
Loving, Kathy Terrell, Jean MacPhail, Susan Gudgeon, Mary Lou Fallis, Chamber Orchestra, Robert Aitken (conductor)
The Nutcracker Suite - Toronto Symphony Orchestra, Andrew Davis
Sonatas for Flute and Harpsichord No. 1,2,3, Robert Aitken, Greta Kraus
The Stratford Ensemble, Raffi Armenian, Maureen Forrester

Best Selling International Album
Winner: Breakfast in America, Supertramp

Other nominees:
Blondes Have More Fun, Rod Stewart
Get the Knack, The Knack
Nightflight to Venus, Boney M
Spirits Having Flown, Bee Gees

Best Jazz Album
Winner: Sackville 4005, Ed Bickert, Don Thompson

Other nominees:
Determination, Michael Stewart, Keith Blackley
Night Child, Oscar Peterson
Rob McConnell & The Boss Brass Again, Rob McConnell and The Boss Brass
Walking on Air, Jim Galloway

Comedy Album of the Year
Winner: A Christmas Carol, Rich Little

Other nominees:
Billy Bishop Goes to War, Eric Peterson
Cinderelly, Al Clouston
Nestor Pistor, Nestor Pistor
Steve's Record, Steve Ivings

Nominated and winning releases

Single of the Year
Winner: "I Just Fall in Love Again", Anne Murray

Other nominees:
 "Boogie Woogie Dancin Shoes", Claudja Barry
 "(Everybody) Get Up and Boogie", Freddie James
 "Midnight Music", Martin Stevens
 "Under My Thumb", Streetheart

Best Selling International Single
Winner: "Heart of Glass", Blondie

Other nominees:
"Born to Be Alive", Patrick Hernandez
"Da Ya Think I'm Sexy?", Rod Stewart
"Le Freak", Chic
"Y.M.C.A.", Village People

References

Bibliography
 Krewen, Nick. (2010). Music from far and wide: Celebrating 40 years of the Juno Awards. Key Porter Books Limited, Toronto.

External links
Juno Awards site

1980
1980 music awards
1980 in Canadian music